Cheryl Ruth Hines (born September 21, 1965) is an American actress, best known for playing the role of Larry David's wife, Cheryl, on HBO's Curb Your Enthusiasm, for which she has been nominated for two Emmy Awards. She also starred as Dallas Royce on the ABC sitcom Suburgatory and made her directorial debut in 2009 with the film Serious Moonlight.

Early life
Hines was born in Miami Beach, Florida, a daughter of James and Rosemary Hines.

Part of her family came from Frostproof, Florida, but she grew up in Tallahassee, where she was a member of the Young Actors Theatre throughout high school. Hines also attended Lively Technical Center and Tallahassee Community College in Tallahassee. She was raised Catholic, and has two brothers and a sister. She attended West Virginia University and Florida State University before graduating from the University of Central Florida.

Career
Before getting her break in Hollywood, Hines worked as a waitress, television reporter and telephone operator, as well as personal assistant to Rob Reiner after she moved to Los Angeles to pursue acting. She enjoyed guest appearances on television shows such as Swamp Thing and Unsolved Mysteries. She also appeared on an episode of the Dating Game in 1996. She was not picked on the episode.

Hines began her acting career by performing improvisational comedy at The Groundlings Theater. Among the people with whom she studied was Lisa Kudrow. She also learned to write comedy sketches—which served her well when working on HBO's Curb Your Enthusiasm as Larry David's fictional wife, Cheryl. The show is written using the retroscripting technique in which the plot outlines are generally and loosely drawn—and then the individual actors improvise to create the dialogue ad lib.

"When the show first came out people from Tallahassee thought, 'Well, maybe Cheryl got married'", she recalls of the show's initial reception. "Sometimes, I do feel like I live two lives." Hines received an Emmy nomination for Outstanding Supporting Actress in a Comedy Series for her work on Curb Your Enthusiasm in 2003 and 2006. Speaking about being cast on the show, Hines has said that "Until Curb, I’d done small roles, really small roles. They wanted to cast an unknown actress. It worked in my favor that I hadn’t done anything. It changed my life."

Hines appeared in RV opposite Robin Williams, Waitress with Keri Russell, and the 2008 mockumentary The Grand, a spoof of the World Series of Poker. Her 2009 directorial debut Serious Moonlight stars Meg Ryan with a script by the late Adrienne Shelly, Hines' co-star in Waitress.

In 2009, Hines starred in the ABC sitcom In the Motherhood. It is a loose adaptation of the web series. She played Jane. The series was short-lived, lasting 5 out of 7 episodes due to low ratings.

During the 2009–2010 season of Brothers & Sisters she guest-starred as Kitty Walker McCallister's campaign manager, Buffy. It was announced in July 2010 that Hines would be joining the cast of the Nickelodeon film based on The Fairly OddParents, A Fairly Odd Movie: Grow Up, Timmy Turner! as a human disguise of Wanda, Timmy's fairy godmother.

Hines served as the executive producer for the 2010 reality series School Pride which follows the renovation of a different school each week. Hines starred as Dallas Royce on the ABC sitcom Suburgatory and in We Need Help, a web series aired on Yahoo! Screen. The series was canceled in 2014 after three seasons.

On January 29, 2014, Hines received the 2,516th star on the Hollywood Walk of Fame.

As of 2020, she has been a permanent panelist on singing game show, I Can See Your Voice.

Personal life
Hines married Paul Young, founder of the management firm Principato-Young, on December 30, 2002. Their daughter Catherine Rose Young was born on March 8, 2004. On July 20, 2010, Hines and Young filed for divorce after nearly eight years of marriage.

When a nephew was born with cerebral palsy, Hines contacted United Cerebral Palsy for answers and resources. Over time, she became involved with UCP and has used her celebrity status to help elevate its visibility. Hines serves on the Board of Trustees of United Cerebral Palsy. Hines and her family won $25,000 for UCP on the July 12, 2015, episode of Celebrity Family Feud.

In December 2011, Hines began dating American environmental lawyer and author Robert F. Kennedy Jr., a member of the Kennedy family. They announced their engagement in April 2014, and were married on August 2, 2014. Kennedy has become a contentious figure because of his anti-vaccine activism. On January 23, 2022, at an anti-COVID vaccine mandate rally in Washington, D.C., he invoked a comparison to Anne Frank. Subsequently, Hines condemned his remarks in a tweet.

Hines is a poker enthusiast, with career winnings totaling $50,000.

Filmography

Film

Television

Producer

Director

Audio broadcasts

Podcasts

Hosted
 2020–present: Tig and Cheryl: True Story – cohosted with Tig Notaro

Guest
 2020: The Modern Moron Episode 64 and 65
 2020: Don't Ask Tig

Awards and nominations

References

External links

 
 Cheryl Hines - Meet the Grand Marshal of the Springtime Tallahassee Grande Parade

1965 births
20th-century American actresses
21st-century American actresses
21st-century American comedians
Actresses from Tallahassee, Florida
American film actresses
American television actresses
American voice actresses
American women comedians
Comedians from Florida
Florida State University alumni
Kennedy family
Living people
University of Central Florida alumni
West Virginia University alumni
People from Miami Beach, Florida
Tallahassee Community College alumni
Leon High School alumni